St. Augustine's Episcopal Church in Oakland, California, formerly known as Trinity Episcopal Church, is a historic church at 525 29th Street. It was built in 1893 and added to the National Register of Historic Places in 1982.

The complex includes a chapel built in 1886 and moved to the site in 1891, a recreation hall built in 1925, and a c.1900 parish house moved to the site around 1912.

References

Episcopal church buildings in California
Churches on the National Register of Historic Places in California
Gothic Revival church buildings in California
Churches completed in 1893
Churches in Oakland, California
National Register of Historic Places in Oakland, California
19th-century Episcopal church buildings